These are a list of matches played by the Mauritius national football team from 1970 to 1979. These were the first games played by Mauritius as an independent nation.

Key

Matches

1970

1971

1972

1973

1974

1975

1976

1977

1978

1979

Mauritius withdrew from the match due to transport problems. Comoros was awarded 3rd place.

References

1970s in Mauritius
Mauritius national football team results